Chemmad, the biggest commercial hub and administrative headquarters of Tirurangadi Taluk, is a fast-growing town in Malappuram district, Kerala, India.

Location
The Tirurangadi Police Station, Taluk Hospital, Telephone Exchange, Sub Road Transport Office, Mini Civil Station and Tirurangadi Taluk (district administration) offices are all located within Chemmad. Apart from Tirur, it is considered one of the larger trade centers of the western part of the Malappuram District, and has undergone an influx of people from other areas over the last 10 years. ck nagar is close nearest village in chemmad . venchali is the largest paddy cultivation area in kerala

Villages and Suburbs
 Parakkadavu
Alinchuvadu
 Manipaadam
Kariparambu
 venchali 9 th turning 
CK Nagar
Mamburam
Kodinchi
Ambalappadi
Kumbankadavu
Pantharangadi

Education 
Darul Huda Islamic University which was established as an Islamic Academy in 1986 and formally upgraded to a university in May 2009 is located in Chemmad.

college and Schools

 Govt High School Trikkulam
 National English Medium Higher Secondary School, Chemmad
 Kuthubuzzaman English Medium Higher Secondary School
 Govt LP school Ck nagar
 Proffessers college of advanced studies 
 Chemmad Arts college

Healthcare 
 Govt Taluk Headquarters Hospital Tirurangadi
 Chemmad Nursing Home
 Pathoor Nursing Home
 Karuna Cancer Hospital and Research Center
 Government Veterinary Dispensary Tirurangadi
 Lailas Hospital
 Dr Ahmmed koya health care

Historic places

 Hajoor kacheri
 Mamburam Maqam

Image Gallery

References

External links

Cities and towns in Malappuram district